Mint Theater Company was founded in 1992 in New York City. Their mission is to find, produce, and advocate for "worthwhile plays from the past that have been lost or forgotten". They have been instrumental in restoring the theatrical legacy of several playwrights notably; Teresa Deevy, Rachel Crothers, and Miles Malleson. As well as producing less produced or forgotten works by noted playwrights such as A. A. Milne, Lillian Hellman, and J. M. Barrie. They have also produced frequently ignored theatrical works by noted authors such as Ernest Hemingway, D. H. Lawrence, and Leo Tolstoy.

New York Times critic Ben Brantley credited Mint Theater Company as a "resurrectionist extraordinaire of forgotten plays". pointing to the company as a torchbearer "devoted to overlooked plays of other times."

History
The Mint Theater Company was founded in 1992 by Kelly Morgan. The mission was further solidified when Jonathan Bank took over as artistic director in 1995, deciding to focus on lost, neglected, or forgotten plays. This focus came from his interest in narrative driven plays that audiences didn't already know. The company's full commitment to neglected works came as audience interest in seeing recovered plays increased, eventually prompting the company to re-establish their mission and change their slogan to "Lost Plays Found Here."

They have done significant work to revive the works of several playwrights who had fallen into obscurity. Their on-going Teresa Deevy Project works to rediscover, produce, and publish works of Irish playwright Teresa Deevy, who despite early success and several productions at the Dublin Abbey Theatre during her lifetime has been largely neglected and her work forgotten. The Mint Theater has produced four plays and published two anthologies of Deevy’s work.

The theater’s revival of Rachel Crothers’ Susan and God in 2006 was the first New York City revival since 1943. Crothers' work had rarely been seen since her death in 1953. The theater also revived her Pulitzer Prize nominated play, A Little Journey in 2011.

They have also revived or sometimes premiered neglected works by famous authors. In 2008 they produced Hemingway's The Fifth Column, using the original text, the first professional production to do so as the 1940 Broadway production used an adapted script by Benjamin Glazer which Hemingway ultimately did not approve. They have produced both of D. H. Lawrence's plays, The Daughter-in-Law in 2003 and The Widowing of Mrs. Holroyd in 2009.

In addition to citations for individual productions, the company has received several awards. In 2001 they received an Obie Grant. In 2002 they were awarded a Drama Desk Special Award for "unearthing, presenting and preserving forgotten plays of merit”. In 2010 they were awarded The Theatre Museum's Theatre History Preservation Award.

Notable Productions
Alison's House by Susan Glaspell
A Little Journey by Rachel Crothers
Becomes A Woman by Betty Smith
Conflict by Miles Malleson
Hindle Wakes by Stanley Houghton
Katie Roche by Teresa Deevy
The Price of Thomas Scott by Elizabeth Baker
The Power of Darkness by Leo Tolstoy
So Help Me God! by Maurine Dallas Watkins
Susan and God by Rachel Crothers
Temporal Powers by Teresa Deevy
The Fifth Column by Ernest Hemingway
The Suitcase Under the Bed  by Teresa Deevy
Wife To James Whelan by Teresa Deevy
Yours Unfaithfully by Miles Malleson
The Daughter-in-Law by D.H. Lawrence

Their 2018 production of Hindle Wakes was nominated for a Drama Desk Award for Outstanding Revival of a Play.

Their 2010 production of So Help Me God! was nominated for four Drama Desk Awards, including Outstanding Revival of a Play.

Publications
Mint Theater Company has published six anthologies from the works of authors that they have produced.

Worthy But Neglected Plays of the Mint Theater Company
Featuring the plays; Mr. Pim Passes By by A.A. Milne, The House of Mirth by Edith Wharton and Clyde Fitch, Alison's House by Susan Glaspell, Miss Lulu Bett by Zona Gale, Welcome to Our City by Thomas Wolfe, Diana of Dobson's by Eleanor Reissa, and Rutherford and Son by Githa Sowerby.
Arthur Schnitzler Reclaimed
Featuring the plays;  Far and Wide and The Lonely Way by Arthur Schnitzler
Harley Granville Barker Reclaimed
Featuring the plays;  The Madras House, The Voysey Inheritance, and Farewell to the Theater by Harley Granville-Barker
St. John Hankin Reclaimed
Featuring the plays;  The Charity That Began at Home and The Return of the Prodigal by St. John Hankin 
Teresa Deevy Reclaimed Volume One
Featuring the plays; Temporal Powers, Katie Roche, and Wife to James Whelan by Teresa Deevy.
Teresa Deevy Reclaimed Volume Two
Featuring the plays; In Search of Valor, The King of Spain's Daughter, Holiday House, Dignity, Strange Birth, Light Falling, Within a Marble City, Going Beyond Alma's Glory, In the Cellar of My Friend, and One Look and What it Led To by Teresa Deevy.

References

External links
 
 

Theatre companies in New York City
Arts organizations established in 1992
1992 establishments in New York City